Daniel 'Dani' Jiménez López (born 5 March 1990) is a Spanish professional footballer who plays as a goalkeeper for CD Leganés.

Club career
Born in Lebrija, Andalusia, Jiménez finished his youth career with Sevilla FC, making his senior debut with the C team in the 2009–10 season, in Tercera División. The same year, he also featured for the reserves in the Segunda División B.

Jiménez signed a contract with Segunda División club CD Mirandés on 10 August 2012. He played his first game as a professional on 8 June 2013, starting in a 2–1 home win against Sporting de Gijón.

On 21 July 2014, Jiménez joined SD Huesca of the third tier. The following summer, he returned to division two with AD Alcorcón.

An undisputed starter for Alkor, Jiménez played all league minutes in the 2020–21 campaign, and on 16 September 2021 he renewed his contract until 2024. The following 31 January, however, he terminated his link, and signed a two-and-a-half-year deal with fellow second division side CD Leganés just hours later.

References

External links

1990 births
Living people
People from Lebrija
Sportspeople from the Province of Seville
Spanish footballers
Footballers from Andalusia
Association football goalkeepers
Segunda División players
Segunda División B players
Tercera División players
Sevilla FC C players
Sevilla Atlético players
CD Mirandés footballers
SD Huesca footballers
AD Alcorcón footballers
CD Leganés players